The Vangunu giant rat (Uromys vika), locally known as the vika, is a giant arboreal species of rodent in the family Muridae. The rat was discovered in the island of Vangunu in the Solomon Islands in 2015, after years of searching based on local stories, and described in 2017. It was identified as a new species on the basis of its skull, skeleton and a detailed DNA analysis. The single individual initially collected from a felled tree (Dillenia salomonensis) measured 46 cm long, weighed between 0.5 and 1.0 kg and had orange-brown fur. Its diet is believed to include thick-shelled nuts like ngali nuts and coconuts, and probably fruits. The species is likely to be designated critically endangered, due to the small amount of forest habitat (about ) remaining on the island and ongoing logging.

References

Uromys
Endemic fauna of the Solomon Islands
Mammals of the Solomon Islands
Rodents of Oceania
Mammals described in 2017